The Sports Administration (SA) is a branch of the Ministry of Education of the Republic of China (Taiwan).

History 
The Sport Administration was initially established in 1932 as the Sports Council (體育委員會). On 12 January 1998, the Sports Affairs Council (行政院體育委員會) of the Executive Yuan was promulgated. Starting 1 January 2013, the council became the Sport Administration and placed under the Ministry of Education.

Organizational structure

Political divisions
 Planning Division
 School Physical Education Division
 Sports for All Division
 Competitive Athletics Division
 International and Cross-Strait Sports Division
 Sports Facilities Division

Administrative divisions
 Secretariat
 Personnel Office
 Accounting Office
 Civil Service Ethics Office

Seal 
The seal of the former Sports Affairs Council consists of three different colors: blue, green, and red. The color blue represents freedom and energy, green represents development, nature, health, and harmony, and red represents passion.

The shape of the seal is combined with three different elements: ume, sun, and human. The ume is used as it is the national flower of the ROC. The sun represents energy and the human represents humanity.

See also
 Ministry of Education (Taiwan)

References

External links 

 

1923 establishments in China
Sports organizations of Taiwan
Sports organizations established in 1932
Sports ministries